Alight Solutions is an Information technology and consulting company based in Lincolnshire, Illinois. The company provides cloud-based digital business and human capital service solutions; particularly within the areas of wealth, health and Human Resources. The company went public on July 6, 2021, trading in the New York Stock Exchange under ALIT.

History
Alight was formed in May 2017 after the acquisition of the benefits outsourcing department of Aon Hewitt by private equity funds affiliated with Blackstone Group L.P. It is headquartered in Lincolnshire, Illinois, with 7 sites located elsewhere within the US.

Acquisitions
In March 2018, Alight entered into a definitive agreement to acquire Future Knowledge, an HR advisory company in Australia and New Zealand. In July 2018, Alight acquired Compass Professional Health Services, a healthcare technology company based in Dallas, Texas. In February 2019, India's third largest software services exporter Wipro sold their Workday and Cornerstone OnDemand business to Alight Solutions for $110 million. On February 22, 2019, Alight announced the acquisition of Carlson Management Consulting, an Adaptive Insights implementation partner. On August 1, 2019, Employee benefits platform Hodges-Mace was acquired by Alight Solutions. On August 22, 2019, Alight Solutions announced the acquisition of NGA Human Resources, a provider of digital human resources and global payroll services.

Partnerships
In September 2018, Wipro announced a $1.5 billion, 10-year engagement with Alight Solutions. According to its contract with Alight, Wipro has been mandated to digitally transform the Illinois-headquartered company's business.

Awards
Alight was certified as a Great Place to Work in October 2018. The International Association of Outsourcing Professionals (IAOP) named Alight to The Best of the Global Outsourcing 100 in May 2019.

References

American companies established in 2017
Business services companies established in 2017
Companies based in Lake County, Illinois
Lincolnshire, Illinois
Business process outsourcing companies of the United States
Corporate spin-offs
Companies listed on the New York Stock Exchange